Hueber is a surname. Notable people with the surname include:

 Aubin Hueber (born 1967), former French rugby union footballer and a current coach
 Charles Hueber (1883–1943), Alsatian politician

See also 
 Hüber (German-language surname)
 Huber (German-language surname)
 Pou (surname)
 Pou (disambiguation)

French-language surnames